Rowlf the Dog is a Muppet character, a scruffy brown dog of indeterminate breed with a rounded black nose and long floppy ears. He was created and originally performed by Jim Henson. Rowlf is the Muppet Theatre's resident pianist on The Muppet Show, as well as one of the show's main cast members. Laid-back and wisecracking, his humor is characterized as deadpan and as such, he is one of few Muppets who is rarely flustered by the show's prevalent mayhem. He is claimed to be the Muppet most like Henson was in real life.

Career
Rowlf was introduced in 1962 for Purina Dog Chow TV commercials aired in Canada, in which he appeared with Baskerville the Hound. Jim Henson designed Rowlf, and Don Sahlin built him; it was Sahlin's first Muppet construction.

The Jimmy Dean Show

Rowlf rose to popularity as Jimmy Dean's sidekick on The Jimmy Dean Show, performed by Henson and Frank Oz. He was the first Muppet with a regular spot on network television, appearing in 85 of the 86 total episodes from 1963 to the show's end in 1966. Jimmy Dean stated that Rowlf's segments were one of the most popular parts of the show, and that Rowlf drew two thousand fan letters a week. Henson was so grateful for the exposure Dean offered on his show, even proposing that he take a 40% stake in Henson's company. Dean refused, however, later saying in 2005, "I didn't do anything to earn that." Dean and Rowlf appeared together for the last time in an episode of The Ed Sullivan Show airing on October 8, 1967, performing "Friendship" while doing the "herd of cows" gag.

Sesame Street

In 1968, Rowlf appeared with Kermit the Frog on the pitch reel for Sesame Street. At the end of the pitch reel, Rowlf is depicted as being eager to join the Sesame Street cast, while Kermit seems reluctant to do so; however, it was Kermit who became a Sesame star, while Rowlf appeared only in one filmed segment and was never a part of the show's regular cast.

The Muppets

In 1976, Rowlf joined the recurring cast of The Muppet Show as the show's pianist. Rowlf also played Dr. Bob, the wisecracking doctor in the recurring medical drama parody skit "Veterinarian's Hospital", alongside nurses Janice and Miss Piggy. Though considered one of the main characters, he rarely interacted with any of the backstage plots involving the show's weekly guest stars.

Rowlf achieved movie stardom with his appearance in The Muppet Movie (1979). The film depicts Rowlf's origin as a musician, at a piano bar, who is discovered by Kermit while on his way to Hollywood. In the scene, Rowlf and Kermit sing the duet "I Hope That Somethin' Better Comes Along!", a song about their troubles with women. Afterwards, Rowlf leaves the bar and joins Kermit and the other Muppets on their trip to Hollywood in search of fame and fortune. He later plays the harmonica during Gonzo's song "I'm Going to Go Back There Someday".

In 1984, Baby Rowlf debuted playing a toy piano during a musical number in The Muppets Take Manhattan. This fantasy sequence with the Muppets as babies was so popular that it resulted in the successful animated cartoon spinoff Muppet Babies. He was voiced on that program by Katie Leigh.

Jim Henson's last public performance as Rowlf before his death was as guest on The Arsenio Hall Show in 1989. For several years afterward, the character was retired out of deference to Henson's memory (only returning for silent cameos in The Muppet Christmas Carol and Muppet Treasure Island), as he was both the first Muppet to achieve popularity and, according to some sources, the character closest to Jim Henson's personality, with Henson's son Brian saying in the introduction to episode 117 of The Muppet Show: "Kermit was my father's best known character, but a lot of people think he was more like Rowlf in real life except he couldn't play the piano as well."

Since 1996, Rowlf has been portrayed by puppeteer Bill Barretta. Barretta has gradually transitioned into the role. Rowlf's first words since Henson's death were in the second episode of Muppets Tonight. Rowlf also had several lines of dialogue in The Muppet Show Live (2001) and spoke two lines of dialogue ("Hey, Kermit!" and "Yeah! Heh, heh. Oh!") in It's a Very Merry Muppet Christmas Movie (2002). In 2005, Rowlf had a 190-word monologue in the second episode of Statler and Waldorf: From the Balcony. Rowlf appeared in the "Keep Fishin'" music video for rock band Weezer. Although he's only briefly seen, Rowlf had a more prominent role in the behind-the-scenes making-of special that accompanied it, Weezer and the Muppets Go Fishin'''.

Additionally, Bill Barretta recorded the vocals as Rowlf singing "The Christmas Party Sing-Along" for the 2006 The Muppets: A Green and Red Christmas album.

Rowlf and Kermit appeared together at the 2011 Disney D23 Expo to honor Jim Henson's posthumous induction as a Disney Legend, singing a live duet of "The Rainbow Connection", as they were Henson's first two Muppet characters.

Rowlf appears in The Muppets (2011), initially saddened he wasn't included in the montage depicting the principal Muppets being reunited (Rowlf was asleep, and was simply woken up by Kermit and easily convinced to join the cause), and helps rebuild the Muppet theater. He also performs "Smells Like Teen Spirit" in a barbershop quartet with Sam the Eagle, Beaker, and Link Hogthrob during the Muppet Telethon, as well as an unwilling (and captive) Jack Black.

As of 2014, Rowlf is on long-term display at the Center for Puppetry Arts in Atlanta, Georgia.

In 2019, Rowlf appeared with Darci Lynne on America's Got Talent: The Champions, singing "Can't Smile Without You".

Filmography

 Various Purina dog food commercials (1962) (TV)
 The Jimmy Dean Show (1963–1966) (TV)
 Sesame Street (Number Song Series #9) (1969) (TV)
 The Muppet Show (1976–1981) (TV)
 The Muppet Movie (1979)
 The Great Muppet Caper (1981)
 The Muppets Take Manhattan (1984)
 Muppet Babies (1984–1991) (TV)
 A Muppet Family Christmas (1987) (TV)
 The Muppet Christmas Carol (1992)
 Muppet Treasure Island (1996)
 Muppets Tonight (1996–1998) (TV)
 Muppets from Space (1999)
 It's a Very Merry Muppet Christmas Movie (2002) (TV)
 The Muppets' Wizard of Oz (2005) (TV)
 A Muppet Christmas: Letters to Santa (2008) (TV)
 Studio DC: Almost Live (2008)
 The Muppets (2011)
 Lady Gaga and the Muppets Holiday Spectacular (2013) (TV)
 Muppets Most Wanted (2014)
 The Muppets (2015–2016) (TV) 
 Muppet Babies (2018) (TV)
 America's Got Talent: The Champions (2019) (TV)
 Muppets Haunted Mansion (2021) (Disney+) – Appearance of the Organist

Album

A solo album titled Ol' Brown Ears is Back'' was released by BMG in 1993 and featured 14 songs recorded by Jim Henson as Rowlf. The album had been recorded in 1984 but went unreleased until three years after Henson's death.

References

External links

Anthropomorphic dogs
Fictional pianists
Talking dogs
The Muppets characters
Television characters introduced in 1962